Erichthonios discovered by the daughters of Cecrops is a 1616 painting by Peter Paul Rubens. It shows Erichthonius of Athens discovered by the daughters of Cecrops, first king of Attica. It is now in the Liechtenstein Museum. In 1632, Rubens made another painting with the same theme; this painting is on display at the Nationalmuseum in Stockholm, Sweden.

References

External links

1616 paintings
Mythological paintings by Peter Paul Rubens
Dogs in art
Paintings of children